Aqil Yazid (born 9 January 2004) is a Singaporean footballer currently playing as a defender for Balestier Khalsa.  He is the son of former international, Yazid Yasin.

Club

Balestier Khalsa
He made his debut against Hougang United.

Career statistics

Club

Notes

International statistics

U19 International caps

U16 International caps

References

External links
 

2004 births
Living people
Singaporean footballers
Association football defenders
Singapore Premier League players
Balestier Khalsa FC players